Ottery Creek is a stream in Iron and Reynolds counties in the U.S. state of Missouri. It is a tributary to the Middle Fork Black River.

The source area is just south of Johnson Mountain and the stream flows south-southwest passing under Missouri Route 32 and parallels Missouri Route A through Bell Mountain Wilderness to pass under Missouri Route 49 south of Edgehill and join the Middle Fork.

Ottery Creek derives its name from John Autrey, a pioneer citizen.

See also
List of rivers of Missouri

References

Rivers of Iron County, Missouri
Rivers of Reynolds County, Missouri
Rivers of Missouri